In baseball, the vulcan changeup pitch (otherwise known as a vulcan or trekkie) is a type of changeup; it closely resembles a forkball and split-finger fastball. It is a variation of the circle changeup, and when mastered can be extremely effective. Much like a forkball, the vulcan is gripped between two fingers on the hand, but rather than the middle and index finger as with the forkball or split-finger fastball, it sits in between the middle and ring fingers to make a v-shape (Vulcan salute) when releasing to the catcher. It is thrown with fastball arm speed but by pronating the hand by turning the thumb down, to get good downward movement on it.

The pitch is uncommon in Major League Baseball. Ian Kennedy throws this style of changeup instead of others because he "found it more comfortable and had more movement". Among the others who have thrown it are John Gant, former relievers Randy Tomlin and Joe Nelson, and most notably former all-star closer Éric Gagné, for whom the vulcan changeup was considered one of his best pitches. Roy Oswalt adopted this pitch during the 2010 offseason and preferred it over the circle changeup.

Nelson explained his choice for naming the pitch: "It was either going to be Nanu Nanu or the Vulcan. Spock just seemed like a cooler character than Mork." The pitch has been nicknamed the "Trekkie", because of the Vulcan symbol, from the television show Star Trek, that appears in the grip of the ball.

References

Baseball pitches
Star Trek fandom